The 1983 Cal State Northridge  Matadors football team represented California State University, Northridge as a member of the Western Football Conference (WFC) during the 1983 NCAA Division II football season. Led by fifth-year head coach Tom Keele, Cal State Northridge compiled an overall record of 6–4 with a mark of 2–1 in conference play, sharing the WFC title with Santa Clara. The team outscored its opponents 205 to 200 for the season. The Matadors played home games at North Campus Stadium in Northridge, California.

Schedule

References

Cal State Northridge
Cal State Northridge Matadors football seasons
Western Football Conference champion seasons
Cal State Northridge Matadors football